Thomas Davidson (30 April 1873 – 16 April 1949) was a Scottish professional footballer, best remembered for his time as a full back in the Football League with Bury. He made over 110 league appearances and won the 1900 FA Cup with the club.

Honours 
Bury
 FA Cup: 1899–1900

Career statistics

References

Scottish footballers
Brentford F.C. players
English Football League players
Association football fullbacks
Dykehead F.C. players
Bury F.C. players
Millwall F.C. players
Southern Football League players
1873 births
Footballers from West Lothian
1949 deaths
Newcastle United F.C. players
FA Cup Final players